Cabasa is a genus of robber flies in the family Asilidae. There are at least three described species in Cabasa.

Species
These three species belong to the genus Cabasa:
 Cabasa glabrata (Walker, 1861) c g
 Cabasa honesta (Walker, 1858) c g
 Cabasa pulchella (Macquart, 1846) c g
Data sources: i = ITIS, c = Catalogue of Life, g = GBIF, b = Bugguide.net

References

Further reading

External links

 
 

Asilidae genera